USS Jefferson may refer to the following ships operated by the United States:

 , a revenue cutter that served from 1802 until 1817
 , brig that served from 1814 until 1825
 , a revenue cutter that served from 1833 until 1847; her named was changed to Crawford in 1839
 , a revenue cutter that was transferred to the US Coastal Survey in 1848 and wrecked in Patagonia in 1851

See also
 
 
 

United States Navy ship names